Brodribb is a surname. Notable people by that name include:

 Laurence Sydney Brodribb Irving (1871–1914), English writer. 
 Gerald Brodribb (1915–1999), cricket historian and archaeologist.
 John Brodribb Bergne (1800–1873), English official, numismatist and antiquary. 
 Harry Brodribb Irving (1870–1919), British actor.